Bruce Richard Doolan (born 9 September 1947) is a former Australian cricketer who played first-class cricket for Tasmania from 1972 to 1978.

Doolan was a left-handed batsman and wicket-keeper. He was a member of the Tasmanian team that played in the state's first ever Sheffield Shield match in 1977, and was a member of the 1978–79 Gillette Cup winning side.

External links

1947 births
Living people
Australian cricketers
Tasmania cricketers
Cricketers from Launceston, Tasmania